Shenzhen Xidesheng Cycling Team is a Chinese UCI Continental cycling team established in 2012.

Team roster

Major results
2018
Overall Tour of Fuzhou, Ilya Davidenok
Stage 4, Mykhaylo Kononenko
2019
Stage 6 Tour of China I, Mykhaylo Kononenko
Stage 1 Tour of Quanzhou Bay, Mykhaylo Kononenko
Overall  Tour of Fuzhou, Artur Fedosseyev
Stage 1, Ilya Davidenok

National champions
2012
 Uzbekistan Time Trial, Muradjan Halmuratov
2014
 Uzbekistan U23 Time Trial, Denis Shaymanov
2015
 Uzbekistan U23 Road Race, Akramjon Sunnatov
 Uzbekistan U23 Time Trial, Akramjon Sunnatov
2016
 Uzbekistan Time Trial, Muradjan Halmuratov
2019
 Ukraine Road Race, Andriy Kulyk

References

External links

UCI Continental Teams (Asia)
Cycling teams established in 2012
Cycling teams based in China